Ingeborg Ruß was a German contralto, focused on concert singing, and an academic voice teacher.

She record compositions by Johann Sebastian Bach, including Bach cantatas such as Singet dem Herrn ein neues Lied, BWV 190, with the Windsbacher Knabenchor conducted by Hans Thamm, alongside Teresa Żylis-Gara, Peter Schreier and Franz Crass. In 1967, she recorded his short masses with the Gächinger Kantorei and the Bach-Collegium Stuttgart conducted by Helmuth Rilling, alongside Elisabeth Speiser, John van Kesteren, Gerhard Faulstich and Jakob Stämpfli. She recorded in 1979 his St John Passion with the Amadeus Choir and Amadeus Orchestra conducted by Karl-Friedrich Beringer, alongside Alejandro Ramirez as the Evangelist,  as the vox Christi, Gerda Hagner, Boldizsár Keönch and Manfred Volz, and his Christmas Oratorio with the Windsbacher Knabenchor conducted by Beringer.

She was an academic voice teacher, at the Nuremberg Conservatory, the Musikhochschule in Würzburg, finally from 1983 to 2002, at the Musikhochschule Detmold. Among her students are Christina Gerstberger and Petra Schmidt.

References

Bibliography

External links 
 
 

German contraltos
Academic staff of the Hochschule für Musik Würzburg
Year of birth missing
Year of death missing
Academic staff of the Hochschule für Musik Detmold